In computing, layout is the process of calculating the position of objects in space subject to various constraints. This functionality can be part of an application or packaged as a reusable component or library.

Examples
 Page layout is the computation of the position of the paragraphs, tabs, sentences, words and letters of a text. This is done by desktop publishing software, typesetting software, and web browsers. These programs typically have dedicated layout routines to calculate the correct position of glyphs and embedded images.
 Some widget toolkits include a layout manager. This component automatically calculates a widget's position based on alignment constraints without the need for the programmer to specify absolute coordinates.
 Graph drawing software automatically determine the position of the vertexes and edges of a graph with various goals like minimization of the number of edge intersections, minimization of total area or production of an aesthetically pleasing result.
 Electronic design automation tools for the place and route step.

See also
 Document layout analysis
 Layout engine (disambiguation)